Woodsmoke is the first studio album by Finnish neofolk / ambient band Nest. It was released on January 20, 2003 through Corvus Records.

Track listing
 "The Silvershade Lynx – 6:37	
 "Call of the Wild – 6:45	
 "By the Healing Waters – 4:38	
 "Otterheart – 4:33	
 "Summer Storm – 4:10	
 "Calmly Passing Monument – 4:48	
 "Renewal – 4:14	
 "Courting – 4:23	
 "A Winternight Visage – 4:47

The special edition, limited to 99 copies, was released in a luxury box and contains an additional poster.

Credits
Aslak Tolonen – kantele, vocals
Timo Saxell – bass, vocals

References

2003 debut albums
Nest (band) albums